På vårt sätt may refer to:

På vårt sätt (Miio album), 2003
På vårt sätt (Scotts album), 2008